The Shah Abbasi Caravansarai is a historical caravanserai related to the Safavid dynasty and is located in Karaj.

References 

Caravanserais in Iran